Silene tatarica, called the Tartarian catchfly, is a species of flowering plant in the genus Silene, found in north-central Europe and western Asia, from Germany and Norway eastwards to western Siberia and Kazakhstan. A specialist of riparian habitats, its seeds are dispersed by water.

References

tatarica
Flora of Norway
Flora of Finland
Flora of Central Europe
Flora of Eastern Europe
Flora of West Siberia
Flora of Kazakhstan
Plants described in 1805